Cardinal Conti may refer to:

 Bernardo Maria Conti (1664–1730), cardinal protector of San Bernardo alle Terme, Rome
 Carlo Conti (cardinal) (1556–1615)
 Francesco Conti (cardinal) (died 1521)
 Giannicolò Conti (1617-1698)

 Giovanni Conti (cardinal) (1414–1493)
 Giovanni dei Conti di Segni (died 1213)
 Gregorio Conti (died after 1139), cardinal and Pope (as Antipope Victor IV)
 Innocenzo Conti (1731–1785)
 Lucido Conti (died 1437), a participant in the 1431 papal conclave
 Michaelangelo Conti (1655–1724), cardinal and Pope (as Pope Innocent XIII)
 Niccolò dei Conti di Segni (13th century)
 Ottaviano dei Conti di Segni (died 1234)
 Pietro Paolo Conti (1689–1770), a cardinal created by Clement XIII
 Rinaldo dei Conti di Segni (died 1261), cardinal and Pope (as Pope Alexander IV)
 Ugolino di Conti (died 1241), cardinal and Pope (as Pope Gregory IX)